The 1964 European Nations' Cup quarter-finals was the third round of qualifying competition for the 1964 European Nations' Cup. They were contested by the eight winners from the round of 16. The winners of each of four home-and-away ties progressed to the final tournament. The matches were played in 1963 and 1964.

Qualification

Each tie winner progressed to the quarter-finals. The quarter-finals were played in two legs on a home-and-away basis. The winners of the quarter-finals would go through to the final tournament.

Summary

|}

Matches
The four matches took place over two legs, taking place in 1963 and 1964.

5–5 on aggregate. A replay was played on a neutral ground to determine the winner.

Denmark won 6–5 on aggregate and qualified for the 1964 European Nations' Cup.

Spain won 7–1 on aggregate and qualified for the 1964 European Nations' Cup.

Hungary won 5–2 on aggregate and qualified for the 1964 European Nations' Cup.

Soviet Union won 4–2 on aggregate and qualified for the 1964 European Nations' Cup.

Goalscorers

References

External links
Matches at UEFA.com

 3
1963 in Danish football
1963–64 in Spanish football
1963–64 in Republic of Ireland association football
1963–64 in French football
1963–64 in Hungarian football
1964 in Swedish football
1964 in Soviet football
Q3
Q3
Q3
Q3